The R397 is a Regional Route in South Africa that connects Burgersdorp with Molteno and Sterkstroom. Its northern terminus is the R391 near Burgersdorp. It heads south to meet the R56. It becomes cosigned, heading east-south-east, through Molteno. East of Molteno, it leaves the R56, heading south-east, via the Boesmanshoek pass, to Sterkstroom, where it meets and is briefly cosigned with the R344. Its southern is the N6.

External links
 Routes Travel Info

References

Regional Routes in the Eastern Cape